Aperibeense Futebol Clube, commonly known as Aperibeense, is a Brazilian football club based in Aperibé, Rio de Janeiro state.

History
The club was founded on May 7, 1951. Aperibeense professionalized its football department in 2007, finished as the runners-up in the Campeonato Carioca Third level in the same year, losing the competition to Sendas Pão de Açúcar.

Stadium
Aperibeense Futebol Clube play their home games at Estádio José Gonçalves Brandão. The stadium has a maximum capacity of 15,000 people.

References

Association football clubs established in 1951
Football clubs in Rio de Janeiro (state)
1951 establishments in Brazil